Beloved World is a 1942 German romantic comedy film directed by Emil Burri and starring Brigitte Horney, Willy Fritsch, and Paul Dahlke.

It was made at the Bavaria Studios in Munich.

Plot 
Director General Dr. Blohm and his secretary Karin Hanke are both unmarried and a close-knit couple at work. Professionally, the two play perfectly hand in hand. Since both of them have no private commitments, they focus exclusively on their professional activities. When the two are seen in public, where they inevitably go out together in the evenings, those around them suspect that the two are a couple. One day, Blohm's friend Strickbach, who of course knows that the two are not together, asks Blohm why he actually doesn't marry the attractive Karin.

Everything goes well until one day the general director and his secretary have to spend a night together after an emergency landing far away from civilization. In addition, Blohm wonders whether his friend Strickbach might not be right when he asked why he didn't marry his secretary. So he gathers all his courage and proposes marriage to Karin, which she accepts, completely surprised.

But now, of course, everything is changing. Since Karin is now Blohm's wife, both are separated from each other by work life. Blohm continues to take care of his job as general director, while Karin, who is now his wife, naturally no longer has to be involved in day-to-day business. For her part, however, Karin cannot deal with the new situation. Her sudden inactivity in day-to-day business is alien to her and also uncomfortable. As a result, she decides to separate from her husband in order to finally be active and productive again.

Cast

References

Bibliography

External links 
 

1942 films
Films of Nazi Germany
German romantic comedy films
1942 romantic comedy films
1940s German-language films
German black-and-white films
Bavaria Film films
Films shot at Bavaria Studios
1940s German films